Shahrukh Quddus (born 11 December 1996) is a cricketer who plays for the Kuwait national cricket team. He played in the 2013 ICC World Cricket League Division Six tournament. In August 2022, he was named in Kuwait's T20I squads for their series against Bahrain. He made his T20I debut on 17 August 2022, against Bahrain. He took a hat-trick in his debut T20I match.

References

External links
 

1996 births
Living people
Kuwaiti cricketers
Kuwait Twenty20 International cricketers
Pakistani expatriates in Kuwait
Place of birth missing (living people)